The 2017 Big Sky Conference women's soccer tournament was the postseason women's soccer tournament for the Big Sky Conference held from November 1 to 5, 2017. The five-match tournament took place at EWU Soccer Complex, home of the regular-season champions Eastern Washington Eagles. The six-team single-elimination tournament consisted of three rounds based on seeding from regular season conference play. The Eastern Washington Eagles were the defending champions and successfully defended their title, defeating the Northern Colorado Bears 3–0 in the final. This was the second Big Sky tournament title for the Eastern Washington women's soccer program, both of which have come under the direction of head coach Chad Bodnar.

Bracket

Schedule

First Round

Semifinals

Final

Statistics

Goalscorers 

 1 Goal
 Taylor Bray - Northern Colorado
 Jenny Chavez - Eastern Washington
 Alexa Coyle - Montana
 Brooke Dunbar - Eastern Washington
 Mariel Gutierrez - Northern Colorado
 Savannah Hoekstra - Eastern Washington
 Tea Poore - Portland State
 Maddie Roberts - Northern Colorado
 Regan Russell - Portland State
 Olivia Seddon - Northern Colorado
 Alexis Stephenson - Eastern Washington
 Chloe Williams - Eastern Washington

References

External links 
2017 Big Sky Conference Women's Soccer Championship

Big Sky Conference Women's Soccer Tournament
2017 Big Sky Conference women's soccer season